The 2017 Étoile de Bessèges was a road cycling stage race that took place between 1 and 5 February 2017. The race was rated as a 2.1 event as part of the 2017 UCI Europe Tour, and was the 47th edition of the Étoile de Bessèges cycling race. The race included five stages; the first four were road stages while the fifth and final stage was an  individual time trial. The champion of the 2016 Étoile de Bessèges, Jérôme Coppel, did not defend his title as he had retired from professional cycling at the end of the 2016 season.

 rider Lilian Calmejane took the first professional stage race win of his career, after fending off a late charge from 's Tony Gallopin in the final stage time trial. Calmejane – who won the third stage of the race – held an 18-second lead over Gallopin going into the time trial, but despite Gallopin's best efforts, setting a time some 13 seconds quicker than anyone else, Calmejane was able to retain the race leader's orange jersey by 5 seconds. The race's other classifications were won by  rider Nico Denz for the mountains classification, while 's Alexander Kristoff won the points classification.

Teams
Nineteen teams were invited to start the race. These included four UCI WorldTeams, nine UCI Professional Continental teams and six UCI Continental teams.

Route

Stages

Stage 1
1 February 2017 — Bellegarde to Beaucaire,

Stage 2
2 February 2017 — Nîmes to Rodilhan,

Stage 3
3 February 2017 — Bessèges to Bessèges,

Stage 4
4 February 2017 — Chusclan to Laudun-l'Ardoise,

Stage 5
5 February 2017 — Alès to Alès, individual time trial (ITT)

Classification leadership table
In the 2017 Étoile de Bessèges, four different jerseys were awarded. For the general classification, calculated by adding each cyclist's finishing times on each stage, and allowing time bonuses for the first three finishers at intermediate sprints and at the finish of mass-start stages, the leader received an orange jersey. This classification was considered the most important of the 2017 Étoile de Bessèges, and the winner of the classification was considered the winner of the race.

Additionally, there was a points classification, which awarded a yellow jersey. In the points classification, cyclists received points for finishing in the top 15 in a mass-start stage. For winning a stage, a rider earned 25 points, with 20 for second, 16 for third, 13 for fourth, 11 for fifth with a point fewer per place down to a single point for 15th place. Points towards the classification could also be accrued at intermediate sprint points during each stage; these intermediate sprints also offered bonus seconds towards the general classification. There was also a mountains classification, the leadership of which was marked by a blue jersey. In the mountains classification, points were won by reaching the top of a climb before other cyclists, with more points available for the higher-categorised climbs.

The fourth jersey represented the young rider classification, marked by a white jersey. This was decided in the same way as the general classification, but only riders born after 1 January 1994 were eligible to be ranked in the classification.

References

External links
 

Etoile de Besseges
Etoile de Besseges
2017